Silver Lake Township is one of twelve townships in Dickinson County, Iowa, USA.  As of the 2000 census, its population was 1,159.

Geography
According to the United States Census Bureau, Silver Lake Township covers an area of 28.72 square miles (74.37 square kilometers); of this, 27.14 square miles (70.3 square kilometers, 94.53 percent) is land and 1.57 square miles (4.07 square kilometers, 5.47 percent) is water.

Cities, towns, villages
 Lake Park

Adjacent townships
 Diamond Lake Township (east)
 Lakeville Township (southeast)
 Excelsior Township (south)
 Allison Township, Osceola County (southwest)
 Fairview Township, Osceola County (west)

Cemeteries
The township contains Silver Lake Cemetery.

Lakes
 Silver Lake

Landmarks
 City Park
 Trappers Bay State Park

School districts
 Harris-Lake Park Community School District

Political districts
 Iowa's 5th congressional district
 State House District 06
 State Senate District 03

References
 United States Census Bureau 2007 TIGER/Line Shapefiles
 United States Board on Geographic Names (GNIS)
 United States National Atlas

External links

 
US-Counties.com
City-Data.com

Townships in Dickinson County, Iowa
Townships in Iowa